Zhong Rong (ca. 468–518) was a leading scholar in Chinese traditional poetics, who lived in Southern Dynasties. His representative writing was "Shi Ping" 《詩評》 (Criticism of Poetry or Grades of Poetry) which was renamed "Shi Pin" 《詩品》 (Ranking Poetry) in the Northern Song Dynasty. This thin book is the first one that we have found so far which aims to mark or taste Chinese poets and their poetry. Its introduction or preface presents a profound poetic theory. In the beginning, it tried to define what is poetry and connected it with Daoist's main concept "Qi" (“气”).

Zhong Rong wrote about the more philosophical of the poems written during the time period of the reign period of Yongjia, near the end of the Western Jin Dynasty, saying that overemphasizing the lofty ideas of the Yellow Emperor (Xuan Yuan) and Laozi  resulted in "bland and tasteless" poetry.

References

External links
 

Chinese scholars
Year of death unknown
Southern Qi poets
Liang dynasty poets
Year of birth unknown
468 births
518 deaths
5th-century Chinese poets
6th-century Chinese poets
6th-century Chinese writers